Amar Akbar & Tony is a 2015 British comedy-drama film written and directed by Atul Malhotra and starring Rez Kempton, Sam Vincenti and Martin Delaney in the lead roles. Amar Akbar & Tony is an independent British feature film. The title is a play on the 1977 Indian film Amar Akbar Anthony.

Cast
 Rez Kempton as Amar
 Sam Vincenti as Akbar
 Martin Delaney as Tony
 Karen David as Meera
 Laura Aikman as Samantha
 Goldy Notay as Sonia
 Tanveer Ghani as Uncle Jay
 Amrita Acharia as Richa
 Dev Sagoo as Mr Singh
 Munir Khairdin as Southall Sanj
 Manrina Rekhi as Nita
 Kumall Grewall as Mr Khan
 Shide Boss as Nadeem
 Olly Messenger as Kurt
 Maggot as Toilet Attendant
 Kay Aujla as Mrs Singh
 Jean Heard as Emily Williams
 Cloudia Swann as Nicola
 Terry Sue Patt as Priest
 Meera Syal as Honey
 Nina Wadia as Seema
 Ace Bhatti as Doc
 Vauxhall Jermaine as PC Johnson 
 Amrit Maghera
 Kumud Pant as CD Stall Man
 Rohan Vij as Amar aged 11

References

External links
 
 
 

2015 films
2015 comedy-drama films
British Indian films
British comedy-drama films
2010s English-language films
2010s British films